Plagiochila fasciculata is a species of liverwort in the family Plagiochilaceae. Found in eastern Australia and New Zealand in moist sites.

References

Jungermanniales
Flora of New South Wales
Flora of Queensland
Flora of Victoria (Australia)
Flora of Tasmania
Flora of New Zealand
Plants described in 1839